IHSA can refer to:
Illinois High School Association
Intercollegiate Horse Show Association